Teo-Swa, or Chaoshan and in older literature Teochew, may be
Teo-Swa people, more commonly known as the Teochew people
Teo-Swa Min, the Chinese language spoken by the Teo-Swa people